Sheikh Ahmad Mohseni Garakani , (born 1926) is an Iranian Ayatollah. He was the Imam of Friday Prayer in Tuyserkan and the Chief of the Supreme Court of Iran, as well as representing the people of Markazi province in the Assembly of Experts since 1998.

Biography 

Ahmad Garakani was born on 1926 in a village called Garakan in Markazi province. His father, Ali Asghar was a farmer, so their family was involved around agriculture. After attending primary school, he pursued his Islamic education by travelling to Qom in 1946 to attend the Qom Seminary. He attended classes from many esteemed Shia scholars such as Hossein Borujerdi, Ruhollah Khomeini, and Mohaghegh. He travelled to Najaf and attended the Hawza Najaf for around a year. While in Najaf, he was taught by Abu al-Qasim al-Khoei, Muhsin al-Hakim and others. After the 1979 Iranian revolution, he was appointed as the prayer leader in Tuyserkan by Khomeini. He spent several years as a judge in the Supreme Court, before being elected as Chief of Supreme Court by Sadeq Larijani in September 2009.

Teachers 
Here are some of Ayatollah Garkani's teachers on his journey to becoming an Ayatollah.

 Ruhollah Khomeini
 Muhsin al-Hakim
 Abu al-Qasim al-Khoei
 Hossein Borujerdi
 Mohammad-Reza Golpaygani
 Muhammad Husayn Tabatabai
 Seyed Mahmoud Hosseini Shahroudi
 Sheikh Mahdi Mazandarani
 Seyed Reza Sadr
 Sheikh Abbas Tehrani
 Seyed Hossein Tabatabai Qomi
 Sheikh Mohammad Lakani
 Sheikh Mohammad Mojahedi Tabrizi

Works 
Ayatollah Garakani has published many works in Iran, here are some of them.

 Hijab in Islam
 Friday Prayers
 Tafsir Surah al-Jumu'ah
 Tafsir Surah al-Munafiqun
 The Guardianship of Ahlul Bayt (as)
 Zakat (charity) in Islam
 The Message of Action
 Velayat Faqih and the Position of Leadership Experts

See also 

 List of Ayatollahs
 List of members in the Third Term of the Council of Experts
 List of members in the Fourth Term of the Council of Experts
 List of members in the Fifth Term of the Council of Experts
 Judicial system of the Islamic Republic of Iran
 Zaynolabideen Ghorbani

References 

1926 births
Living people
Members of the Assembly of Experts
20th-century Iranian judges
People from Markazi Province
Iranian ayatollahs